Lifespan or life span may refer to:

 Lifespan (film), 1976 film starring Klaus Kinski
 Lifespan (album), 2004 album by Kris Davis
 Lifespan (book), 2019 book by David Andrew Sinclair
 Lifespan (video game), Atari 8-bit computer game

See also
 Maximum life span, the maximum lifespan observed in a group
 Life expectancy, the average lifespan expected of a group
 Longevity, the average lifespan expected under ideal conditions
 Lifetime (disambiguation)